The Good Lovelies are a Canadian folk/country harmony trio, consisting of Caroline Brooks, Kerri Ough and Sue Passmore. At their core they can be described as a country/folk trio, with tinges of pop, roots, jazz and sometimes hip-hop mixed in.

History
The group's three members, Brooks from Whitby, Ough from Port Hope and Passmore from Cobourg, were all performing as solo artists in the Toronto area when they came together in 2006 to perform at a Christmas concert at Toronto's Gladstone Hotel.

The three subsequently decided to continue working together, releasing their debut EP, Oh My, in 2007. They released their first full-length album, The Good Lovelies, in 2009, and followed up with the Christmas-themed EP Under the Mistletoe later the same year.

Their album The Good Lovelies won the Juno Award for Roots & Traditional Album of the Year – Group at the 2010 Juno Awards.

The Good Lovelies performed at the Australian National Folk Festival in 2011, playing songs from their 2011 album Let the Rain Fall; they also performed in Newcastle upon Tyne, England, playing at the Evolution Festival, UK and other venues around the North East.

In 2017 the trio toured northern Ontario, performing and presenting workshops.

In February 2018 the Good Lovelies released the digital version of their album, Shapeshifters, which featured a shift from their usual folk to a more pop music sound. They performed once more at the Australian National Folk Festival, singing songs from the new album. They  recorded a track on Fred Penner's Juno Award-winning album, Hear the Music. Later that year they performed at Massey Hall in Toronto and were nominated for a Canadian Folk Music Award.

In March 2019 the trio released the physical version of Shapeshifters, and toured in the UK to promote the album beginning in April 2019.

Discography 
 Oh My! (EP, 2007)
 Good Lovelies (2009)
 Under the Mistletoe (2009)
 Let the Rain Fall (2011)
 Live At Revolution (2012)
 Burn the Plan (2015)
 Winter's Calling (EP, 2015)
 Shapeshifters (2018)
 Evergreen (2019)

References

External links
 

Musical groups established in 2006
Musical groups from Toronto
Canadian folk music groups
Canadian country music groups
2006 establishments in Ontario
Juno Award for Roots & Traditional Album of the Year – Group winners
Canadian Folk Music Award winners